The AIL Desert Raider is an Israeli 6x6 buggy. It is used for surveillance purposes. It is marketed as an airborne, all terrain reconnaissance, surveillance and fast attack vehicle.

References

Off-road vehicles